My Gospel may refer to:

My Gospel, a 1987 album by Etta Cameron
"My Gospel", a song by Charlie Puth from Nine Track Mind, 2016